The 1st Rhythmic Gymnastics Asian Cup was held in Ulaanbaatar, Mongolia from October 26 to 28, 2018. The competition had senior and junior divisions, and a team event consisting of two senior gymnasts and one junior gymnast.

Medal winners

Team

Senior

Individual

Group

Junior

Individual

Participating nations

See also
 2018 Asian Rhythmic Gymnastics Championships

References

2018 in Mongolian sport
Gymnastics competitions in Mongolia
International gymnastics competitions hosted by Mongolia
2018 in gymnastics